The 1930 Clemson Tigers football team was an American football team Clemson College—now known as Clemson University—as a member of the Southern Conference (SoCon) during the 1930 college football season. In their fourth and final season under head coach Josh Cody, the Tigers compiled an 8–2 record (3–2 against conference opponents), finished ninth in the conference, and outscored opponents by a total of 239 to 82.

Right halfback Johnnie Justus was the team captain. Four Clemson players were selected as first-team players on the 1930 All-Southern Conference football team: center Red Fordham; guard Mule Yarborough; and quarterback Maxcy Welch and left halfback Grady Salley.

After the season, Josh Cody resigned as Clemson's head coach to accept an assistant coaching job under Dan McGugin at Vanderbilt.

Schedule

References

Clemson
Clemson Tigers football seasons
Clemson Tigers football